The 2020 season was St Patrick's Athletic F.C.'s 91st year in existence and was the Supersaint's 69th consecutive season in the top-flight of Irish football. It was the first full season with Stephen O'Donnell as manager, having taken over from Harry Kenny on 31 August 2019. The season was hit by the Coronavirus pandemic after just 4 league games, which resulted in the league being halted from March to July as well as being halved from 36 games to just 18, the League of Ireland Cup and the Leinster Senior Cup were also abandoned in earlier rounds than Pat's had entered into. The season finished with Pat's in 6th place, while they were knocked out of the FAI Cup by Finn Harps in the first round.

Squad

Transfers

Pre-season

In

Out

Mid-season

In

Out

Squad statistics

Appearances, goals and cards
Number in brackets represents (appearances of which were substituted ON).
Last updated – 10 November 2020

Top scorers
Includes all competitive matches.
Last updated 10 November 2020

Top assists
Includes all competitive matches.
Last updated 10 November 2020

Top clean sheets
Includes all competitive matches.
Last updated 10 November 2020

Disciplinary record
Last updated 10 November 2020

Captains

Club

Coaching staff
Head coach: Stephen O'Donnell
Assistant manager: Pat Cregg
First-team coach: Alan Mathews
Director of Football: Ger O'Brien
Coach: Seán O'Connor
Opposition Analyst: Martin Doyle
Goalkeeping coach: Pat Jennings
Strength and Conditioning Coach: Chris Colburn
Physio: Mark Kenneally
Physio: Lee Van Haeften
Physio: Christy O'Neill
Club Doctor: Dr Matt Corcoran
Equipment Manager: David McGill
Under 19s Manager: Jamie Moore
Under 19s Coach: Sean Doody
Under 17s Manager: Darragh O'Reilly
Under 17s Assistant Manager: Sean Gahan
Under 15s Manager: Seán O'Connor
Under 15s Coach: Ian Bermingham
Under 13s Manager: Mark Connolly
Under 13s Coach: Brendan Clarke
Under 19s/17s Goalkeeping Coach: Stephen O'Reilly

Kit

|
|
|
|
|
|}

The club released new Home & Away kits for the season, with the 2019 season's away kit being used as the Third kit for the season.

Key:
LOI=League of Ireland Premier Division
FAI=FAI Cup
EAC=EA Sports Cup
LSC=Leinster Senior Cup
FRN=Friendly

Competitions

League of Ireland

League table

Results summary

Results by round

Matches

FAI Cup

EA Sports Cup

Leinster Senior Cup

Friendlies

Pre-season

Mid-season

References

2020
2020 League of Ireland Premier Division by club